Brigadier Augustine Kamyuka Kyazze, is a Ugandan military officer in the Uganda People's Defence Forces (UPDF). He currently serves as the Deputy Chief of Logistics and Engineering in the UPDF, responsible for Engineering. In the past, he has served as Commander of the Armoured Component for AMISOM.

Background
He was born in 1961 in Mpigi District, in Uganda's Central Region.

Military education
Augustine Kyazze joined the Uganda military in 1987. In 1997, he was commissioned. His military training included the following courses, among others: 1. A Cadet Officer Course 2. A Course in Tank Platoon Commanders 3. A Course in Armoured Command and Tactics 4. A Tank Battalion Commander’s Course and 5. A Senior Command and Staff College Course.

Military career
Among the assignments that Brigadier Kyazze has undertaken over the years, are the following: (a) Commanding Officer of a Tank Unit (b) Acting Brigade Commander Armoured Brigade (c) Chief Instructor Kalama Armoured Warfare Training School, Kabamba, Mubende District, Central Uganda. (d) Commander of the  Armoured Component for AMISOM and (e) Deputy Chief of Logistics and Engineering In the UPDF, responsible for Engineering, his current assignment.

In is current position, he stresses the importance of troop training, having the right equipment, the maintenance of discipline, professionalism and troop cohesion.

Other considerations
Brigadier Augustine Kyazze is married with children. He is of the Christian faith. He maintains a  farm in Bukulula Sub-county, Kalungu District, in the Greater Masaka sub-region of the Buganda Region of Uganda.

See also
 Yoweri Museveni
 Uganda People's Defence Forces
 Crispus Kiyonga

References

External links
 UPDF Promoted Generals Decorated
 New Guard Takes Charge of UPDF In New Changes 
Partial List of Senior UPDF Commanders

Living people
1961 births
Ugandan military personnel
People from Mpigi District
People from Central Region, Uganda
Ganda people
Ugandan generals